Ulises Ruiz Ortiz (born April 9, 1958) is a Mexican politician and former governor of the State of Oaxaca. He took office in 2004 as a member of the Institutional Revolutionary Party (PRI).

Controversies 
Ruiz Ortiz was accused by some of murder and rigging the 2004 election. Therefore, many did not view him as the popularly elected governor of Oaxaca.

More controversies occurred during Ruiz's administration.

First, the newspaper Noticias de Oaxaca, which holds political views contrary to those of Ruiz, suffered a massive strike organized by the Confederación Revolucionaria de Obreros y Campesinos union, affiliated with Ruiz's PRI. Some media outlets, like Reforma viewed this action as a repression of free speech. The paper tried to publish out of the state, but distribution trucks were vandalized. The paper openly accused Ruiz of repression.

Other examples included the destruction caused by public works to the historic city center of the state capital. Some intellectuals called the destruction so appalling that they feared that UNESCO would retire the city's declaration as a World Heritage Site.

At the beginning of the 2006 Mexican general election campaign, Presidential candidate Andres Manuel López Obrador tried to campaign in one of the state's poorest municipalities in Guelatao, also the birthplace of Benito Juárez. The rally was obstructed by public works started only a day earlier by the state government.

2006 conflict 
Since May 2006 (previous to the federal elections), Ruiz Ortiz's administration faced protests by striking teachers from Section 22 of the SNTE (the National Union of Teachers). Among other demands, the teachers demanded an economic reclassification for the state of Oaxaca, which would allow a raise in the salaries. Protesters sat in the city's main square until their demands were met. The protesters refused to meet with the government of Ruiz, insisting on meeting only with members of the federal government. On June 14, 2006, police were sent to remove the teachers forcibly from the square using gas bombs and rubber bullets. The strikers responded and managed to repel the police forces. After these actions, the teachers movement added to their demands the immediate resignation of the governor. The perceived repression used against the teachers ignited numerous protests from the people inside and outside of the state.

Numerous civil and political organizations joined the teachers movement, forming the APPO or Asamblea Popular del Pueblo de Oaxaca (Popular Assembly of the People of Oaxaca). The main petition of the APPO is the immediate resignation of Ulises Ruiz. Numerous popular protests demanding Ruiz's resignation took place all over the state. Government offices, public radio stations and public broadcasting systems have been taken over by the APPO. A legal petition was sent to the federal Congress to remove the governor.

Ruiz Ortiz has stated that he has no plans to resign. While initially not involved in the conflict, the Federal government has since sent a commission to help in the negotiations and has called for the governor to step down. On October 29, federal police were sent to occupy the city and have been involved in confrontations with the APPO throughout November.

Since the government offices have remained closed due to the protests, the governor has moved his office to a hotel.

In August 2006 the conflict became increasingly violent, with increased attacks aimed at terrorizing protesters. Armed groups have fired on popular protests, and on August 21 and 22 attacked radio stations held by the APPO. Ulises Ruiz's administration denies responsibility for these attacks.

On September 3, 2006, 193 delegates from different organizations which constitute the APPO (Popular Assembly of the People of Oaxaca) declared the governor Ulises Ruiz Ortiz (URO) "proscrito" – banned, exiled, unwelcome – in the state of Oaxaca. The ex-governor will be replaced by a "proclamation of good government for the city of Oaxaca, a proclamation for the 570 municipalities, and a manifesto to the nation, declaring the banishment of Ruiz Ortiz from the government, and that the government will continue to be exercised from the historic center of the city of Oaxaca".

At least seventeen people have been killed in Oaxaca, almost of them by police or paramilitary forces allied with Ulises Ruiz Ortiz since the onset of the conflict, including US IndyMedia Journalist Bradley Roland Will. In response to recent deaths, Subcomandante Marcos of the EZLN has issued a statement from the Clandestine Indigenous Revolution Committee, claiming that the Federal Government caused these deaths to help Ruiz stay in power.

On November 6, 2006, the conflict escalated after five groups committed a series of small bombing attacks in Mexico City demanding Ruiz's resignation. The attacks consisted of three explosions in the PRI headquarters, the TEPJF main office, a branch of Scotiabank. Presumably, eight bombs were set and another Scotiabank branch was set to explode, as well as a Sanborns store, however these last two targets failed to explode. The Federal Government has stated that these acts are terrorist propaganda activities that seek to plant fear in the population, however it has also stated that the only possible solution is that Ruiz resigns his post in Oaxaca, or personally negotiates an end to the violence.

2014 Arrest 
He was arrested on suspicion of embezzlement in 2014.

See also
 2006 Oaxaca protests

References

External links

Living people
1958 births
Governors of Oaxaca
Institutional Revolutionary Party politicians
Politicians from Oaxaca
Members of the Congress of Oaxaca
Members of the Senate of the Republic (Mexico)
Members of the Chamber of Deputies (Mexico)
National Autonomous University of Mexico alumni
20th-century Mexican politicians
21st-century Mexican politicians